Pathogenic Ocular Dissonance is the third studio album by the American Christian metal band Tourniquet. It was originally released on Intense Records in 1992 to the Christian market and later released on Metal Blade Records in 1993 to the secular market. It is the last Tourniquet album to feature vocalist Guy Ritter, who left the band after the recording of the album. It was independently re-released on Pathogenic Records in 2001 with digital remastering, two bonus live tracks from the 2000 Dutch Flevo Festival featuring then-lead vocalist Luke Easter, and new cover art (with "Dissonance" misspelled as "Dissonence" on the tray liner edges). Another remaster was released, by Retroactive Records, on June 26, 2020 with the original cover art, an expanded album booklet, and four different bonus tracks. Pathogenic Ocular Dissonance was voted as the "Favorite Album of the 1990s" by readers of HM Magazine. In 2010, HM Magazine ranked it #23 on the Top 100 Christian metal albums of all-time list.

Recording history
Pathogenic Ocular Dissonance was recorded at different studios, one being Mixing Lab A & B. The album was produced by Metal Blade Records' Bill Metoyer.

Musically, the album went for a more aggressive thrash metal direction. The songs are complicated and technical and feature experiments with styles such jazz and blues. The latter can be heard on the song "Phantom Limb". The band's characteristical style of incorporating classical music into its guitar riffs is especially reminiscent on the beginning of the title track. The album introduced more Slayer-esque shouting vocal patterns by Gary Lenaire as well as a darker atmosphere. Guy Ritter sang less on the album than on previous Tourniquet albums. It is often thought that the vocalist Guy Ritter left the band during the recording session. However, during an interview with HM Magazine in 2007 he clarified:

Ritter stated his reasons for leaving the band:

According to Ritter, there was also some disagreements concerning the label:

Themes

The lyrics kept the pattern that began on Psycho Surgery and feature bizarre medical terminology. These terms and syndromes are used as metaphors for spiritual and social issues. The album title refers to color blindness and the title song uses it as a metaphor for lack of wisdom of sight from God. "Gelatinous Tubercles of Purulent Ossification" is about nicotine addiction that causes larynx benediction. The sound samples of the song are produced with Western Electric 5000 voice synthesizer.

The album's final song "The Skeezix Dilemma" uses the board Uncle Wiggily's (also a children's book series by Howard Roger Garis) concept as an allegory for child abuse. The song starts out with a minute of circus music (organ played by Bob Beeman) which is followed by a nervous child reading a bit of the game's introduction. The heavy metal song "Exoskeletons" contains a short riff of Black Sabbath's 1972 song "Supernaut" at the end. The Metal Blade Records version of Pathogenic Ocular Dissonance contains a live version of Trouble's 1984 song "The Tempter" from Tourniquet's Intense Live Series, Vol. 2 and features vocalist Les Carlsen of the American Christian metal band Bloodgood; this track was later included on the 2020 remaster along with three instrumental demos.

Track listing

Credits
Tourniquet
Guy Ritter - vocals
Gary Lenaire - guitars, vocals
Erik Mendez - guitars
Victor Macias - bass
Ted Kirkpatrick - drums

Tourniquet Live
Ted Kirkpatrick - Drums
Luke Easter - Vocals
Aaron Guerra - Guitars, Vocals
Steve Andino - Bass

References

External links
Pathogenic Ocular Dissonance (1992) at Tourniquet.net
Pathogenic Ocular Dissonance (2001) at Tourniquet.net

Tourniquet (band) albums
1992 albums